Wayne Morse (1900–1974) was a U.S. Senator from Oregon from 1945 to 1969. Senator Morse may also refer to:

Allen B. Morse (1837–1921), Michigan State Senate
Chuck Morse (born 1960), New Hampshire State Senate
Elmer D. Morse (1844–1921), Wisconsin State Senate
Frank Morse (Oregon politician) (fl. 1970s–2010s), Oregon State Senate
Isaac Edward Morse (1809–1866), Louisiana State Senate
John F. Morse (1801–1884), Ohio State Senate
John Morse (Colorado politician) (born 1954), Colorado State Senate
Stanford Morse (1926–2002), Mississippi State Senate
Steven Morse (politician) (born 1957), Minnesota State Senate